Marland Sewer is a minor,  long river (brook) and drainage ditch in the Pevensey Levels of Hailsham, Wealden District, East Sussex, England. Rising from Winters Cut, Marland Sewer drains water in farmland north of the A27 road, and forms multiple tributary streams. It gives rise to Glynleigh Sewer, itself a tributary of Pevensey Haven. One pumping station moves a culvert stream into Marland Sewer.

References 

Rivers of East Sussex
Rivers of the Pevensey Levels